Osman Kamara (born 31 December 1987) is a Sierra Leonean swimmer. He competed in the 100 m freestyle, 50 m backstroke and 50 m butterfly events at the 2012 FINA World Swimming Championships (25 m) and in the 50 m freestyle and 50 m butterfly events at the 2013 World Aquatics Championships in Barcelona. In Barcelona he set national records for the 50 m butterfly and 50 m freestyle.

References

Living people
1987 births
Sierra Leonean male swimmers
Swimmers at the 2016 Summer Olympics
Olympic swimmers of Sierra Leone
Sierra Leonean male freestyle swimmers
Male backstroke swimmers
Male butterfly swimmers
Swimmers at the 2015 African Games